Black Chariot is a 1971 American blaxploitation drama film directed by Robert Goodwin and starring Bernie Casey, Barbara O. Jones, and Paulene Myers.

Cast
 Bernie Casey as The Drifter
 Barbara O. Jones as The Drifter's lover
 Richard Elkins as Leader of The Organization
 Paulene Myers as The Drifter's mother
 Gene Dynarski as White doctor

References

External links
 

1971 films
American exploitation films
1971 drama films
Films shot in California
Blaxploitation films
1970s English-language films
1970s American films